Lewis Brittan Skinner Jr. was a professional football player in the early 1920s. He played in the early National Football League for the Hammond Pros and the Evansville Crimson Giants. Prior to playing pro football, Skinner played at the college level at Purdue University.

1898 births
Players of American football from Indianapolis
Purdue Boilermakers football players
Evansville Crimson Giants players
Hammond Pros players
1941 deaths